Amore e rabbia (Love and Anger) is a 1969 Italian-French anthology film that includes five films directed by five Italian directors and one French director. It premiered at the 19th Berlin International Film Festival in 1969.

Plot
The film is composed of episodes that deal with some of the themes present in Jesus' parables and anecdotes of the canonical gospels. These issues, however, are reproduced in the present from their directors.

Segments

Indifference
A man is suffering from road, badly injured. Passers do not deign to look at him, and continue walking on their way. The episode is taken from Jesus' parable of the Good Samaritan.

Agony
A bishop is ill and about to die. Before he dies, the man has a vision of God, who tells him that his life has been misspent. The bishop realizes that he spent his life not properly respecting the gospel, but now it is too late.

The sequence of the paper flower
A beautiful smiling guy's walking on the streets of a city, bringing with him a large poppy paper. The boy is the goodness and innocence of youth, which is soon cut short by human wickedness. Indeed, while the merry boy is walking, the episode shows the evil done by man during the Second World War. At the end of the story, the boy is struck by lightning from the sky and dies, guilty of having been in his life a happy person and a good neighbor.

Love
A woman and a man're arguing with each other. They represent democracy and the people's revolution that can not get along, although their ideas are similar.

We tell, tell
A group of young guys occupies a university. Young people are fighters student revolution of the Sixties, and now that they have in hand the building, the guys begin to argue among themselves, bringing new ideas and changes. However, they do nothing but talk nonsense, not changing anything in society.

Cast
Discutiamo, discutiamo directed by Marco Bellocchio and Elda Tattoli
Marco Bellocchio as Lecturer

Agonia directed by Bernardo Bertolucci
Julian Beck as Dying Man
Jim Anderson
Judith Malina
Giulio Cesare Castello as Priest
Adriano Aprà as Clerk
Fernaldo Di Giammatteo
Petra Vogt
Romano Costa as Clerk
Milena Vukotic as Nurse

L'Amore directed by Jean-Luc Godard
Christine Guého
Nino Castelnuovo
Catherine Jourdan
Paolo Pozzesi

L'indifferenza directed by Carlo Lizzani
Tom Baker

La sequenza del fiore di carta directed by Pier Paolo Pasolini
Ninetto Davoli as Riccetto
Rochelle Barbini as The little girl
Aldo Puglisi as Dio

References

External links 

1969 films
1969 drama films
Films directed by Jean-Luc Godard
Films directed by Pier Paolo Pasolini
Films directed by Bernardo Bertolucci
Films directed by Carlo Lizzani
Films directed by Marco Bellocchio
Italian anthology films
Italian drama films
Films set in Rome
French anthology films
Films scored by Giovanni Fusco
1960s Italian films